Barstow is an unincorporated community in Rock Island County, Illinois, United States. Barstow is east of East Moline and Silvis. Barstow is located on a wye that connects track owned by the BNSF Railway, including the Barstow Subdivision. These tracks were previously owned by the Chicago, Burlington and Quincy Railroad (CB&Q), and a station once existed within the wye.

Barstow was to be the site of a planned hog plant and a Nascar race track, but both plans were shelved after heavy opposition to them.

Demographics

References

External links
 A CB&Q freight train passes Barstow in 1966

Unincorporated communities in Rock Island County, Illinois
Unincorporated communities in Illinois
Former Chicago, Burlington and Quincy Railroad stations